This is a list of Spanish television related events from 1961.

Events
18 March - Spain enters the Eurovision Song Contest for the first time with "Estando contigo" performed by Conchita Bautista.
 July - The music show Escala en hi-fi, by Fernando García de la Vega debuts in TVE. First time Playback appears on Spanish TV.
 30 September - Antonio (dancer) shows off on the programa Gran Parada.
 10 October- Debut on TVE of one of the first Variety Shows in Spanish TV, titled Amigos del martes, with Artur Kaps, Franz Johan and Gustavo Re.
 14 October - Adolfo Marsillach debuts as author on Televisión Española with the sitcom Silencio, se rueda.

Debuts

Television shows
Telediario (1957- )
 Fila cero (1958-1962)
 Pantalla deportiva (1959-1963) 	
 Fiesta brava (1959-1964) 	
 Gran parada (1959-1964) 	
 Teatro de familia (1959-1965) 	
 Primer aplauso (1959-1966) 	
 Tengo un libro en las manos (1959-1966)
 Panorama (1960-1963)
 Gran teatro (1960-1964)

Ending this year
 Club del martes (1960-1961) 	
 Cuarta dimensión (1960-1961) 
 Holmes and Company (1960-1961) 	
 Mujeres solas (1960-1961)

Foreign series debuts in Spain 
 This Is Alice (Así es Alicia)
 The Adventures of Rin Tin Tin (Las aventuras de Rin Tin Tin)
 Colonel Humphrey Flack (Coronel Flack)
 The Four Just Men (Los 4 hombres justos)
 Meet McGraw (El detective Meet McGraw)
 The Twilight Zone (Dimensión desconocida)
 Circus Boy (El niño del circo)
 My Friend Flicka (Mi amiga Flicka)
 The Flintstones (Los Picapiedra)
 Five Fingers (Cinco dedos) 
 Hong Kong (Hong Kong)

Births
 5 January - Isabel Gemio, hostess.
 9 January - Alipio Gutiérrez, host.
 1 March - David Cantero, host.
 2 March - Emma Ozores, actress.
 7 March - Agustín Bravo, host.
 25 March - Pedro Reyes, comedian.
 1 April - Juan Echanove, actor.
 14 May - Cristina Higueras, actress.
 22 May - Alfonso Arús, host.
 27 May - Ana Blanco, hostess.
 11 June - María Barranco, actress.
 20 June - Javivi, actor.
 21 June - Fernandisco, host.
 28 July - Aitor Mazo, actor.
 28 November - Ramón García, host.
 3 December - Javier Capitán, host.
 27 December - José Ribagorda, host.
 Cristina Morató, hostess.

See also
1961 in Spain
List of Spanish films of 1961

References